Wayne Graham (born 21 January 1965) is a South African former field hockey player who competed in the 1996 Summer Olympics.

References

External links

1965 births
Living people
South African male field hockey players
Olympic field hockey players of South Africa
Field hockey players at the 1996 Summer Olympics
Alumni of Grey High School
20th-century South African people
21st-century South African people